Thomas Patrick Lowndes de Waal (born 1966) is a British journalist and writer on the Caucasus. He is a senior fellow at Carnegie Europe. He is best known for his 2003 book Black Garden: Armenia and Azerbaijan Through Peace and War.

Life and career 
Thomas was born in Nottingham, England. He is the son of Esther Aline (née Lowndes-Moir), a writer on religion, and Anglican priest Victor de Waal. He is the brother of Africa specialist Alex de Waal, barrister John de Waal, and potter and writer Edmund de Waal.

Through his grandmother, Elisabeth de Waal (née Ephrussi), Thomas de Waal is related to the Ephrussi family who were wealthy Jewish bankers and art patrons in pre-World War II Europe and whose fortunes started in 19th-century Odessa. He had done some research on the family's Russian branch, and helped with the research of his family's history by his brother Edmund de Waal, which led to the publication of the book The Hare with Amber Eyes.

Thomas de Waal graduated from Balliol College, Oxford, with a First Class Degree in Modern Languages (Russian and Modern Greek).

He has reported for, amongst others, the BBC World Service, the Moscow Times, and The Times. He was a Caucasus editor at the Institute for War and Peace Reporting (IWPR) in London until December 2008, and later as a research associate with the peace-building NGO Conciliation Resources. From 2010 to 2015, de Waal worked as a senior associate in the Russia and Eurasia Program at the Carnegie Endowment for International Peace, specialising primarily in the South Caucasus region. Currently he is a senior fellow with Carnegie Europe, specializing in Eastern Europe and the Caucasus region.

He is the co-author of Chechnya: Calamity in the Caucasus (New York, 1998) and author of Black Garden: Armenia and Azerbaijan Through Peace and War (New York, 2003).

In 2006 the Ministry of Foreign Affairs of Russia denied an entry visa to De Waal, who was due to attend in Moscow the presentation of a Russian version of his book on the conflict in Nagorno-Karabakh, citing a law that says a visa can be refused "in the aims of ensuring state security." De Waal believes that his visa denial was retaliation for his critical reporting about the Russian war in Chechnya.

De Waal wrote the introduction to Anna Politkovskaya's first book in English, A Dirty War (critical of the Chechen war).

In 2021 he was criticised in an open letter addressed to Carnegie Europe and signed by fourteen scholars, including Henry Theriault, Bedross Der Matossian, Elyse Semerdjian, and Marc A. Mamigonian for his article "What Next After the U.S. Recognition of the Armenian Genocide?", stating that its "inaccuracies and minimizations have ... contributed to denial of the Armenian Genocide".

Bibliography

References

External links 
Finding aid to the Thomas de Waal interviews at Columbia University. Rare Book & Manuscript Library

1966 births
Living people
English male journalists
English people of Dutch descent
English people of Austrian-Jewish descent
Alumni of Balliol College, Oxford
Ephrussi family